Yaxham is a village and civil parish in centre of the English county of Norfolk. The parish includes the village of Yaxham, together with the neighbouring community of Clint Green.

The villages name origin is uncertain. 'Cuckoo homestead/village' or 'Geac's homestead/village'.

For the purposes of local government, the parish falls within the district of Breckland.

Yaxham Mill which includes the original windmill tower dating from 1860 is now a successful bed and breakfast business with a popular Indian Restaurant called Rani’s also on the site. There are several other holiday cottages for rent in and around the village as well as a range of small businesses, covering Complementary Therapies, IT, Photography, Podiatry, Public Relations and Social Housing.

"Yaxham St. Peter" is one of 124 existing round-tower churches in Norfolk. There is an Evangelical Congregational church in Clint Green.  The Village is home to Yaxham CE VA Primary School.

Yaxham railway station in the village is on the Mid-Norfolk Railway, a heritage railway running between the historic market towns of Wymondham and Dereham. The Yaxham Light Railway can also be found adjacent to the railway station.

Notable people
John Johnson, Rector of Yaxham 1800 to 1833

See also
HMS Yaxham, a Ham class minesweeper

Notes

External links

.
 for Clint Green
Yaxham Village Website
Information from Genuki Norfolk on Yaxham.
St Peter's on the European Round Tower Churches website
Yaxham Heritage Initiative
Yaxham Indian Restaurant

Villages in Norfolk
Breckland District
Civil parishes in Norfolk